Zoran Janković may refer to:

Zoran Janković (politician) (born 1953), Slovenian businessman and politician
Zoran Janković (footballer) (born 1974), Serbian-born Bulgarian football manager and former player
Zoran Janković (water polo) (1940–2002), Yugoslavian water polo player
Zoran "Bajo" Janković, Macedonian musician best known as the bassist for Aleksandar Makedonski